In geometry, a snub is an operation applied to a polyhedron. The term originates from Kepler's names of two Archimedean solids, for the snub cube and snub dodecahedron. In general, snubs have chiral symmetry with two forms: with clockwise or counterclockwise orientation. By Kepler's names, a snub can be seen as an expansion of a regular polyhedron: moving the faces apart, twisting them about their centers, adding new polygons centered on the original vertices, and adding pairs of triangles fitting between the original edges.

The terminology was generalized by Coxeter, with a slightly different definition, for a wider set of uniform polytopes.

Conway snubs 
John Conway explored generalized polyhedron operators, defining what is now called Conway polyhedron notation, which can be applied to polyhedra and tilings. Conway calls Coxeter's operation a semi-snub.

In this notation, snub is defined by the dual and gyro operators, as s = dg, and it is equivalent to an alternation of a truncation of an ambo operator. Conway's notation itself avoids Coxeter's alternation (half) operation since it only applies for polyhedra with only even-sided faces.

In 4-dimensions, Conway suggests the snub 24-cell should be called a semi-snub 24-cell because, unlike 3-dimensional snub polyhedra are alternated omnitruncated forms, it is not an alternated omnitruncated 24-cell. It is instead actually an alternated truncated 24-cell.

Coxeter's snubs, regular and quasiregular 

Coxeter's snub terminology is slightly different, meaning an alternated truncation, deriving the snub cube as a snub cuboctahedron, and the snub dodecahedron as a snub icosidodecahedron. This definition is used in the naming of two Johnson solids: the snub disphenoid and the snub square antiprism, and of higher dimensional polytopes, such as the 4-dimensional snub 24-cell, with extended Schläfli symbol s{3,4,3}, and Coxeter diagram .

This alternated construction requires q to be even.

For example, Kepler's snub cube is derived from the quasiregular cuboctahedron, with a vertical Schläfli symbol , and Coxeter diagram , and so is more explicitly called a snub cuboctahedron, expressed by a vertical Schläfli symbol , and Coxeter diagram .

The snub octahedron represents the pseudoicosahedron, a regular icosahedron with pyritohedral symmetry.

The same process applies for snub tilings:

Examples

Nonuniform snub polyhedra 
Nonuniform polyhedra with all even-valance vertices can be snubbed, including some infinite sets; for example:

Coxeter's uniform snub star-polyhedra 
Snub star-polyhedra are constructed by their Schwarz triangle (p q r), with rational ordered mirror-angles, and all mirrors active and alternated.

Coxeter's higher-dimensional snubbed polytopes and honeycombs 

Examples

There is only one uniform convex snub in 4-dimensions, the snub 24-cell.

 

 

See also 
 Snub polyhedron

References 

 Coxeter, H.S.M. Regular Polytopes, (3rd edition, 1973), Dover edition,  (pp. 154–156 8.6 Partial truncation, or alternation)
Kaleidoscopes: Selected Writings of H.S.M. Coxeter, edited by F. Arthur Sherk, Peter McMullen, Anthony C. Thompson, Asia Ivic Weiss, Wiley-Interscience Publication, 1995, Googlebooks 
 (Paper 17) Coxeter, The Evolution of Coxeter–Dynkin diagrams, [Nieuw Archief voor Wiskunde 9 (1991) 233–248]
 (Paper 22) H.S.M. Coxeter, Regular and Semi Regular Polytopes I, [Math. Zeit. 46 (1940) 380–407, MR 2,10]
 (Paper 23) H.S.M. Coxeter, Regular and Semi-Regular Polytopes II, [Math. Zeit. 188 (1985) 559–591]
 (Paper 24) H.S.M. Coxeter, Regular and Semi-Regular Polytopes III, [Math. Zeit. 200 (1988) 3–45]
Coxeter, The Beauty of Geometry: Twelve Essays, Dover Publications, 1999,  (Chapter 3: Wythoff's Construction for Uniform Polytopes)
 Norman Johnson Uniform Polytopes, Manuscript (1991)
 N.W. Johnson: The Theory of Uniform Polytopes and Honeycombs, Ph.D. Dissertation, University of Toronto, 1966
 John H. Conway, Heidi Burgiel, Chaim Goodman-Strass, The Symmetries of Things 2008, 
 
 Richard Klitzing, Snubs, alternated facetings, and Stott–Coxeter–Dynkin diagrams, Symmetry: Culture and Science, Vol. 21, No.4, 329–344, (2010) 

Geometry
Snub tilings